Monika Kühn (born 2 April 1967) is a German diver. She competed at the 1988 Summer Olympics representing West Germany and the 1992 Summer Olympics representing unified Germany.

References

External links
 

1967 births
Living people
German female divers
Olympic divers of West Germany
Olympic divers of Germany
Divers at the 1988 Summer Olympics
Divers at the 1992 Summer Olympics
Sportspeople from Aachen
20th-century German women